Akini Jing or Zhu Jingxi (Chinese:朱婧汐; born April 18, 1988), born Yue Hanzan (月罕瓒), of Dai ethnicity from Yunnan, China, is a singer, songwriter, and music producer. She released her first solo album in 2008 in Taiwan under Universal Music. She released her second solo album in September 2014. In 2018, with her single Shadow, she became the first Chinese artist to enter the Billboard Dance Club Chart Top 40. 

In 2019, she began her career as Akini Jing, a cyborg with a unique and impersonal perspective. In 2020, she participated in Sisters Who Make Waves, started up her own music label Akini Music, and released her cyborg concept album, Plastic Heaven. In 2022, she released a concept album Endless Farewell.

In March 2023, she officially announced her association with 88rising, followed by the release of single Pump Up.

Discography

Studio albums 
 2008: At the End of the Sky (天空的边际)
 2014: Equine Dreams (以梦为马)
 2020: Plastic Heaven (塑胶天堂)
 2022: Endless Farewell (永无止境的告别)

EP 
 2004: Shangri-La 香格里拉 (June Zhu debut single EP)
 2013: She 她 (June Zhu single EP)
 2015: Before Tonight 夏的最后一日 (Jingxi Zhu single EP)

Singles 
 2013: 为爱追寻, 茄子
 2016: Heading To The Dawn
 2017: Love Sick, 刺猬爱孔雀
 2018: Shadow, Ice Cream Run
 2019: 火焰, 双星, The Last of Human, ENEMY, 上山采茶, Crescent
 2020: 愿我, FaceTime Love, Love City, Feeling, 生生不息, 圈圆
 2021: HURTS!, 科技兑现想象，云梦三千年，中国李宁Eureka, If You Feel Lonely Tonight
 2022: 冲浪, GOLDEN PAGODA, Glow in the Dark, Goodbye
 2023: Pump Up

Songwriting Credits 

 I see - Xiaotong Guan
 旷梦 - Silence Wang
 时差 On Call - LuHan
 不再 - Jeff Chang
 某时某刻 Catch me when I fall - LuHan
 致爱 Your Song - LuHan
 勋章 Medals - LuHan
 诺言 Promises - LuHan

References

External links
M.yyq.cn
Weibo.com
Blog.sina.com.cn

1988 births
Living people
Singers from Yunnan
21st-century Chinese women singers
Dai people